USS O-12 (SS-73) was an O-class submarine of the United States Navy. These later O-boats, O-11 through O-16, were designed by Lake Torpedo Boat to different specifications than the earlier Electric Boat designs. They performed poorly as compared to the Electric Boat units, and are sometimes considered a separate class. The ship was launched in 1917 and entered service with the Navy in 1918 in the Panama Canal Zone.

Taken out of service by the US Navy in 1924, the submarine was leased for use in Arctic exploration in 1930 sponsored by William Randolph Hearst. Renamed Nautilus, the submarine suffered significant damage while exploring the Arctic in 1931 and having recorded significant data while there, Hearst considered the venture a failure. Having returned to Norway to repair the damage, the submarine was returned to the United States Navy there, and they had the submarine towed down a fjord and scuttled in November 1931.

Service history
The submarine's keel was laid down on 6 March 1916 by the Lake Torpedo Boat Company in Bridgeport, Connecticut. O-12 was launched on 29 September 1917, sponsored by Mrs. Homer S. Cummings, and commissioned on 18 October 1918. O-12 spent much of her career as a unit of Submarine Division 1, based at Coco Solo, Panama Canal Zone. In 1921, she was awarded a Battle Efficiency Pennant and trophy for gunnery (gun and torpedo). She decommissioned on 17 June 1924 after just five and a half years of service, and was placed in reserve at the Philadelphia Navy Yard.

Nautilus Arctic Expedition 
Struck from the Naval Vessel Register on 29 July 1930, ex-O-12 transferred to the United States Shipping Board for conversion by the Philadelphia Navy Yard.  She was leased at the rate of one dollar per year to Lake and Danenhower, Inc., of Bridgeport, Connecticut, for use on Hubert Wilkins's and Lincoln Ellsworth's Arctic Expedition of geophysical investigation. The lease required that she either be returned to the Navy for disposal, or scuttled in at least  of water.

On 24 March 1931, she was re-christened Nautilus.  As Prohibition prevented the use of an alcoholic beverage, she was baptised not with the traditional champagne but rather with a bucket of ice cubes. Great French writer Jules Verne's grandson was present at the event, under the French flag, along of course with Sir Hubert's new-wed wife, actress Suzanne Bennett.

Simon Lake equipped Nautilus with several clever devices for under-ice operations.  One was a mechanical probe, much like a trolley pole, that would scrape along the bottom of the ice cap to indicate how much clearance the submarine had below the ice. Others included drills supposedly capable of cutting through  of ice to reach fresh air. The vessel's torpedo chamber was converted into a moon pool, when its water-tight door was closed, pressure was equalized, so a trap door could be opened, allowing the lowering of scientific instruments.  These innovations were tested only cursorily before the boat put to sea.

Nautilus with her crew of 20 men was commanded by Captain Sloan Danenhower, son of John Wilson Danenhower, who served aboard  during her Arctic expedition. Nautilus, on 4 June 1931, began the crossing from New York City, United States, to Plymouth, England, the first leg of the voyage that was planned to take them up the coasts of the North Sea to Spitsbergen and conclude with a dramatic rendezvous at the North Pole with the German airship Graf Zeppelin.  On that first leg, however, Nautilus encountered a violent storm.  Both engines failed, leaving the boat adrift.  She was rescued and initially towed into Cork Harbour in Southern Ireland on 22 June where her batteries were re-charged, before being towed to England by  where she was repaired.

On 5 August, very late in the year to begin an Arctic expedition, Nautilus began making her way through the English Channel and along the Norwegian coast.  Another storm again damaged the boat, carrying away her bridge and giving her a permanent list, but after a stop in Tromsø on 11 August, she successfully reached Spitsbergen, and Wilkins allowed but a single day for repairs.

The crew carried out the planned scientific experiments as they pushed on northward, but thick pack ice hindered their progress. The boat was ill-equipped to deal with the extreme cold, lacking insulation and heaters.  The fresh water system froze and the hull developed slow leaks.

After ten days, Nautilus reached 82°N, the farthest north any vessel had reached under its own power, and preparations began to dive and proceed under the ice.  However, the boat refused to respond; the stern planes had been carried away at some unknown earlier time.  Without them, the submarine could not control its depth while submerged, and the expedition had to be aborted.

On 31 August, under financial pressure from newspaperman William Randolph Hearst, who had initially promised to pay for the expedition but who indicated by telegraph that Wilkins would not be paid if he did not continue, Wilkins ordered the submarine onward.  Captain Danenhower ordered Nautilus trimmed down by the bow, and deliberately rammed an ice floe in an attempt to force the boat under.  The manoeuvre worked in that Nautilus submerged, and became the first submarine to operate under the polar ice cap.  However, her unconventional method of diving caused significant damage to her upper works.  She was out of radio contact for days, was presumed lost, and rescue efforts were planned. In fact, she had actually travelled only a short distance under the ice before resurfacing through a polynya, but her radios had been badly damaged, requiring days to repair.

The scientific crew continued their experiments, and their findings became the first paper published by the Woods Hole Oceanographic Institution.  On 20 September, Nautilus returned to Spitsbergen carrying invaluable data and with all crew alive. Hearst, however, considered the expedition a failure and carried out his threat, refusing to pay for the expedition.

Fate 
Following the expedition, O-12 was returned to the Navy Department. In 1981 Norwegian divers found her wreck.

In 1959,  was the first submarine to surface at the North Pole and the second submarine (after  in 1958) to reach the North Pole.  Her crew conducted a tribute to Sir George Hubert Wilkins and scattered his ashes over the North Pole.

In 2010 the research submersible JAGO dove to try to locate and inspect Nautilus.

References

External links
 
 Nautilus (Submarine) Photograph Collection

O-12 (SS-73)
World War I submarines of the United States
Military in the Arctic
Shipwrecks in the Norwegian Sea
Ships built in Groton, Connecticut
1917 ships